The 1989 NCAA Division I Cross Country Championships were the 51st annual NCAA Men's Division I Cross Country Championship and the 9th annual NCAA Women's Division I Cross Country Championship to determine the team and individual national champions of NCAA Division I men's and women's collegiate cross country running in the United States. In all, four different titles were contested: men's and women's individual and team championships.

Held on November 20, 1989, the combined meet was hosted by the United States Naval Academy at the Navy Cross Country Course in Annapolis, Maryland. The distance for the men's race was 10 kilometers (6.21 miles) while the distance for the women's race was 5 kilometers (3.11 miles). A record 364 runners, both men and women, contested this championship.

The men's team national championship was won by Iowa State, their first team national title. The individual championship was won by John Nuttall, also from Iowa State, with a time of 15:59.86.

The women's team national championship was won by Villanova, their first national title (and first of their eventual record nine). The individual championship was won by Vicki Huber, also from Villanova, with a time of 15:59.86, the event record time for the 5 kilometer distance (upheld all the way until 2001, when the race distance was extended to 6 kilometers). Huber beat her nearest competitor by almost thirty seconds. This was the first of Villanova's record six consecutive individual women's cross country titles.

Qualification
All Division I cross country teams were eligible to qualify for the meet through their placement at various regional qualifying meets. In total, 22 teams and 181 runners contested the men's championship while 22 teams and 183 runners contested the women's title. This was the first time the women's race featured more competitors than the men's.

Men's title
Distance: 10,000 meters (6.21 miles)
Competitors: 22 teams, 181 runners
Full Results: MileSplit.com

Men's Team Result (Top 10)

Men's Individual Result (Top 10)
Runners in italics were not competing with their full team

Women's title
Distance: 5,000 meters (3.11 miles)
Competitors: 22 teams, 183 runners
Full Results: MileSplit.com

Women's Team Result (Top 10)

Women's Individual Result (Top 10)
Runners in italics were not competing with their full team

See also
NCAA Men's Cross Country Championships (Division II, Division III)
NCAA Women's Cross Country Championships (Division II, Division III)

References
 

NCAA Cross Country Championships
NCAA Division I Cross Country Championships
NCAA Division I Cross Country Championships
NCAA Division I Cross Country Championships
Sports in Annapolis, Maryland
Track and field in Maryland
United States Naval Academy